Tony Rice Plays and Sings Bluegrass is an album by American guitarist Tony Rice, released in 1993.

Track listing 
 "I've Waited as Long as I Can" (Hylo Brown) – 2:58  
 "Brown Mountain Light" (Scotty Wiseman) – 3:40  
 "How Mountain Girls Can Love" (Ruby Rakes) – 2:26  
 "Carolina Star" (Hugh Moffatt) – 3:09  
 "Thunderclouds of Love" (J. Hedre) – 2:50  
 "On and On" (Bill Monroe) – 3:04  
 "This Morning at Nine" (Sid Campbell) – 2:18  
 "I Wonder Where You Are Tonight" (Johnny Bond) – 3:12  
 "Galveston Flood" (John Duffey, Tom Rush) – 3:28  
 "Will You Be Loving Another Man?" (Lester Flatt, Monroe) – 3:01  
 "Girl from the North Country" (Bob Dylan) – 4:19  
 "Ain't Nobody Gonna Miss Me When I'm Gone" (Flatt) – 2:50  
 "I'll Stay Around" (Flatt) – 3:21

Personnel
Tony Rice – guitar, vocals
Vassar Clements – fiddle
Jerry Douglas – dobro
Sam Bush – mandolin, vocals
Mark Schatz – bass
Jimmy Gaudreau – mandolin, vocals
Larry Rice – mandolin, vocals
Mike Auldridge – dobro, vocals
Rico Petrucelli – bass
John Duffey – mandolin, vocals
Bill Emerson – banjo, vocals
Production notes:
Tony Rice – producer
Bill Wolf – producer, engineer
David Glasser – mastering
Tim Talley – photography  
Jack Tottle – liner notes 
Scott Billington – design

References

1993 albums
Tony Rice albums
Rounder Records albums